The Almonte Thunder are a Canadian Junior ice hockey team based in Almonte, Ontario.  They play in the Eastern Ontario Junior Hockey League.

History
The Almonte Thunder were granted expansion into the Eastern Ontario Junior Hockey League in 2009.  The Thunder filled the void in the league left when the Carleton Place Kings were promoted to the Central Junior Hockey League.

At the conclusion of the 2014-15 season, the league announced it was re-organizing to be more of a direct developmental league to the Central Canada Hockey League and renamed the league Central Canada Hockey League Tier 2.  Initially,  the league was to downsize to twelve teams (one feeder club for each Tier 1 team), however it reduced to 16 teams, eliminating 6 of the current franchises, including the Akwesasne Wolves, Almonte Thunder, Gananoque Islanders, Gatineau Mustangs, Morrisburg Lions, and Shawville Pontiacs.

Season-by-season results

External links
Thunder Webpage
EOJHL Webpage

Eastern Ontario Junior Hockey League teams
Ice hockey clubs established in 2009
2009 establishments in Ontario